The men's 200 metres was a sprinting event on the athletics programme at the 1900 Summer Olympics in Paris. It was held on July 22, 1900, well after most of the rest of the athletics events. The 1900 Games were the first time the 200 metres was contested. The races were held on a track of 500 metres in circumference. Eight athletes from seven nations competed. The event was won by Walter Tewksbury of the United States. Norman Pritchard of India took silver while Australian Stan Rowley earned bronze.

Background

This was the first appearance of the event, which was not held at the first Olympics in 1896 but has been on the program ever since. American Walter Tewksbury had taken silver in the shorter sprint events in 1900 (the 60 metres and 100 metres), but the winners of those events did not compete in the 200 metres; he had also won the 400 metres hurdles. Stan Rowley of Australia had finished third in both of those events as well. Norman Pritchard of India had finished second in the 200 metres hurdles, beating Tewksbury who finished third.

The seven nations that contested the first 200 metres race were Australia, France, Germany, Hungary, India, Norway, and the United States.

Competition format

There were two rounds, semifinals and a final. The top two runners in each of the two semifinals advanced to the final. The "track" was a grass field with a 500 metre long course winding through trees.

Records

These were the standing world and Olympic records (in seconds) prior to the 1900 Summer Olympics.

* unofficial

Bill Holland set the first Olympic record when he won the first heat of the first round in 24.0 seconds. In the final Walter Tewksbury set a new Olympic record with 22.2 seconds.

Schedule

Results

Semifinals

In the semifinals, there were two heats. The top two runners in each advanced to the final.

Semifinal 1

The first heat was an easy win for Holland.

Semifinal 2

Rowley beat Tewksbury by about a foot, and neither of the other two runners were close.

Final

Tewksbury passed Pritchard in the second half of the race and crossed the finish line 2½ yards clear of the field, with Pritchard half a yard ahead of Rowley, and Rowley six inches ahead of Holland, who was the slowest in the final despite improving upon his time by over a second.

Sources

 International Olympic Committee.
 De Wael, Herman. Herman's Full Olympians: "Athletics 1900". Accessed 18 March 2006.
 

Men's 0200 metres
200 metres at the Olympics